The Verrayon House (Danish: Verrayons Gård)is a Rococo, bourgeoisie townhouse located at Lille Strandstræde 6 in central Copenhagen, Denmark. It was listed by the Danish Heritage Agency in the Danish national registry of protected buildings in 1943.

History

18th century

The property was listed as No. 29 in St. Ann's East Quarter in Copenhagen's first cadastre of 1689. It was at that time owned by Niels Simonsen.  The property was listed as No. 104  in the new cadastre of 1756 and was then owned by captains Thye and Søren Seerup.

The present building on the site was constructed in 1769 for the French diplomat (legationsråd) Honoré Antoine Mossois de Verrayon . It is believed that the architect was Nicolas-Henri Jardin. The writer Tyge Rothe, who introduced a Danish audience to many of the ideas of the  Age of Enlightenment, lived in the building from 1776 to 1783. He had recently returned to Copenhagen after serving a few years as prefect (Amtmand) in Segeberg in Schleswig-Holstein. He had previously had a career in the central administration but fell out of favour at the court with Struense's fall in 1772. He also owned the estate Tybjerggård at Næstved.

The property was home to 18 residents in four households at the 1787 census. Rasmus Jørgensen, a just 30-year-old merchant and the owner of the property, resided in the building with the office clerk Georg Nicolay Matzen and the caretaker Hans Iwersen. Joswa Gottlob Conradi, a customs officer, resided in the building with his wife Giertrud Petersen, their four children (aged 16 to 29) and one maid. Peter Gosch, a warehouse manager associated the Østersøeiske og Guiniske Hande, resided in the building with his wife Johanne Arine Werliin, three children in their care (aged 10 to 14) and one maid. Andreas Christoffersen, a sailor, resided in the building with his wife Sidse Matthias Datter, their one-year-old son and one maid.

19th century
The property was home to 20 residents in five households at the time of the 1801 census. Jørgen Krøyer, a 60-year-old man of means, resided in the building with a caretaker and three maids. Magde Elenore, a 72-year-old woman of means,resided alone in another apartment. Ane Margrethe Steege, a 75-year-old widow, resided in the building with a housekeeper and two maids. Lorentz Gabriel, a sea captain, resided in the building with his wife Marie Cecilie Gabriel. their three children (aged eight to 15)m a seamstress and a maid. Anders Peder Bistrup, the proprietor of a tavern in the basement, resided in the associated dwelling with his wife Margrethe Bistrup	and one maid.

The property was listed as No. 72  in the new cadastre of 1806. It was at that time owned by candle maker Jens Almind.

The property was home to 27 residents in four households at the 1834 census. Johan Peter Thulstrop, an artistic turner, resided on the ground floor with his wife Marie (née Ravm) and one maid. Christian Carl von Mehren (1786-), a merchant and consular secretary, resided on the first floor with his wife Ane Magrethe Christine Brandt	(1803-1864)m their two children (aged six and nine), his 23-year-old nephew Christian Carl August von Mehren and two maids. Ole Larsen, a master building painter, resided on the second floor with his wife M.Catharine Lindberg, their four children (aged four to 19), two apprentices and two maids. Lars Steiner Thønnes Petersen, a master shoemaker, resided in the basement with his wife Nicoline Schals, their four children (aged four to 15) and one maid.

The property was home to 26 residents at the 1840 census. Alexander Gerhard Møller, a man of means, resided on the ground floor with his wife Catharine Josephine Møller, his mother Anna Dorthea Møller and one maid. Johan Peter Ekmann, a businessman (mægler), resided on the first floor with his wife Anna Holgine Maria Ekmann, their one-year-old son, one lodger (student) and two maids. Ole Larsen, the master painter from the 1834 census, was still residing on the second floor with his wife, two sons, two maids and three apprentices. Lars Thønnes Petersen, the master shoemaker, from the 1834 census, was still residing in the basement with his wife, their three children, one maid and one lodger.

The property was again home to 25 residents in four households at the 1845 census. Jens Andersen Kofoed (1777-), a master carpenter and captain in the Fire Corps, resided on the ground floor with his wife Karen Kofoed, their 31-year-old son Johan A.Kofoed and one maid. Collestinus P. Hindberg, a customs officer, resided on the first floor with his wife Arcadia Hindberg	/aged 16 and 26), a foster daughter and a maid. Ole Larsen was still residing in the second floor apartment. Andreas Christiansen, a workman, resided in the basement with his wife Johanne Christiansen and their four children (aged four to 12).

The property was again home to four households at the 1850 census. Johan Ambrosius Kofoed (1814-), a son of the former owner, was now residing in the ground floor apartment with his wife Anna Cathrine Kofoed (née Østerby(his father Jens Andersen Kofoed	and one maid. Jørgen von Formann (1799-1864), a captain in the 6th Infantry Battalion, resided on the first floor with his wife Emilie Caroline Formann (née Bentzon, 1809-), their four children (aged four to 11), one lodger and one maid. Ole Larsen	was still residing on the second floor. Wilhelm M. Jørgensen, a new master shoemaker, resided in the basement with his wife Ane Jørgensen født Johnsen, their five children (aged eight to 18), a shoemaker and a shoemaker's apprentice.

The property was home to 34 residents in five households at the 1860 census. Eduard Schmidt, a ship captain, resided in the building with his wife Solborg Schmidt (née Jonasen=, their one-year-old son 	Eduard Christ. Møller Schmidt, one maid and one lodger. Lindhard Hansen Carl, a helmsman, resided in the building with his wife Marthe Marie Carl f. Olsen, their seven children (aged one to 17) and three maids. Regine Frederikke Nagel, widow of a businessman (grosserer) named Nagel. resided in the building with her 30-year-old daughter Christiane Henricke Nagel and one maid. Johannes Hansen Walbom, a shoemaker, resided in the building with his wife Henriette Walbom f. Ficher, their four children (aged nine to 15) and two lodgers (shoemaker and ballet dancer). Wilhelm Magnus Jørgensen, another shoemaker, resided in the building with his wife Ane Jørgensen f. Johnsen, two daughters (aged 18 and 28), one shoemaker and one lodger.

The property was home to 25 residents in four households at the 1880 census. Gabriel Alexander Henrichsen, a master tailor, resided on the ground floor with his wife Elise Petra Henrichsen and their 18-year-old foster daughter Ida Marie Geschwimdner. Johan Christian Hørup Wandall, a retired master tailor, resided on the first and second floors with his five children (aged 20 to 36) and one maid. Johanne Christine Liisberg, a widow, resided on the third floor with her five children (aged 14 to 28). The two eldest sons were grocers. Rasmus Holtemose Lynge, a master shoemaker, resided in the basement with his wife Nicoline Lynge, their three children (aged eight to 11) and three lodgers (shoemakers, employees).

20th century
The building was listed by the Danish Heritage Agency in the Danish national registry of protected buildings in 1943. It went through a major refurbishment in the early 1990s.

Architecture

The building is four bays wide and consists of three storeys, Mansard roof and cellar. The windows are placed in slightly recessed sections. Decorative elements include demi-circular (en plein cintre) blind arches are found above the windows of the bel étage. Corbels support the main cornice.  Some details are remniscient of the Yellow Mansion in Amaliegade.

A three-storey, half-timbered rear sing dates from before 1732 and probably around 1700. The complex also comprises a warehouse extension from about 1805.

Today
The building was acquired by Jeudan in December 2021. It contains a shop and seven residential apartments. It has a total floor area of 1,294 square metres.

References

External links

 Nyhavn at indenforvoldene.dk

Houses in Copenhagen
Listed residential buildings in Copenhagen
Rococo architecture in Copenhagen
Houses completed in 1769
1769 establishments in Denmark